The 1945 North Carolina Tar Heels football team represented the University of North Carolina at Chapel Hill during the 1945 college football season. The Tar Heels were led by third-year head coach Carl Snavely, his first at UNC since 1935 (he coached at Cornell from 1936 to 1944). North Carolina played their home games at Kenan Memorial Stadium and competed as a member of the Southern Conference.

Schedule

References

North Carolina
North Carolina Tar Heels football seasons
North Carolina Tar Heels football